Natmura Pukuria High School (NPHS) is a secondary school in the northern part of Banshkhali Upazila in Chittagong, Bangladesh.

History 
Natmura Pukaria High School was founded by Mahbub Alam Anwar in 1957. The first class, year 6, had twenty-four students. The following year the school added a class of year eight students. Eight years after the first class, Natmura Pukuria was able to add a class of year nine students. In 1967 the first Secondary School Certificate (SSC) batch of students took the public exam.

Campus 
The campus is located in Pukuria  village, where Banshkhali Upazila crosses Sangu river. It is about 25 km away from Chittagong city. The covers about 1.9 acres. It operates two enclosed buildings and a tin shade building.

Facilities

Multimedia classes 
The Government of Bangladesh introduced ‘multimedia classrooms’ and ‘teacher-led content development’ in 15,200 secondary schools through projects of Ministry of Education and Ministry of Primary and Mass Education across the country. A minimum of two daily multimedia classes are held.

Digital classes 
In 2018 the school launched digital classes using tablets.

Management 
The school has a management system under the rules of Intermediate and Secondary Education Boards, Bangladesh. Rahbar Alam Anwar is the present chairman of the School Managing Committee.

Results 
The Board of Intermediate and Secondary Education, Chattogram conducts two public exams every year: Junior School Certificate exam (JSC) for class eight student, and Secondary School Certificate (SSC), which is required for completing secondary education.

References

External links 
School Website

Schools in Chittagong District
High schools in Bangladesh
Banshkhali Upazila